Emma Shane Fletcher (born February 4, 1995) is a Canadian soccer player who plays for Arna-Bjørnar in the Norwegian Toppserien.

References

External links 
 
 
 Emma Fletcher at LSU Tigers
 Emma Fletcher at California Golden Bears

1995 births
Living people
Women's association football midfielders
California Golden Bears women's soccer players
Canada women's international soccer players
Canadian people of New Zealand descent
Canadian women's soccer players
Canadian expatriate women's soccer players
Expatriate women's footballers in Norway
Toppserien players
Footballers at the 2015 Pan American Games
LSU Tigers women's soccer players
New Zealand women's association footballers
Soccer players from Victoria, British Columbia
Pan American Games competitors for Canada
Canadian expatriate sportspeople in Norway
Canadian expatriate sportspeople in the United States
Expatriate women's soccer players in the United States